David Levi-Faur (born in  Haifa, Israel) is an Israeli political scientist and academic who specializes in comparative political economy and public policy, regulation and governance.  He is currently affiliated with the Hebrew University of Jerusalem. He is the author of over 70 academic papers.

Levi-Faur is one of the main authorities on regulation in the social sciences. He was co-founder of the ECPR Standing Group on Regulation and Governance. Together with John Braithwaite and Cary Coglianese, Levi-Faur is a founding editor of the Regulation & Governance journal.

Together with Avishai Benish he edits the Working Papers series Jerusalem Papers in Regulation & Governance

Books
Levi-Faur edited the Handbook on the Politics of Regulation, The Oxford Handbook of Governance and together with Jacint Jordana, The Rise of Regulatory Capitalism; The Global Diffusion of a New Order and The Politics of Regulation.

Media
He is the founder of the Israeli Social Sciences Network and the Political Science email Network.

References

1961 births
Living people
Israeli political scientists